The men's 400 metres at the 1946 European Athletics Championships was held in Oslo, Norway, at Bislett Stadion on 22 and 23 August 1946.

Medalists

Results

Final
23 August

Heats
22 August

Heat 1

Heat 2

Heat 3

Participation
According to an unofficial count, 15 athletes from 12 countries participated in the event.

 (1)
 (1)
 (2)
 (1)
 (1)
 (1)
 (1)
 (1)
 (1)
 (2)
 (1)
 (2)

References

400 metres
400 metres at the European Athletics Championships